Buckie is one of the eight wards used to elect members of the Moray Council. It elects three Councillors.

Councillors

Election results

2022 by-election
A by-election was called following Lib Dem councillor Christopher Price's resignation after just three months in the role.

2022 election
2022 Moray Council election

This election was uncontested because the number of candidates who stood was equal to the number of available seats. There are three seats in Buckie ward, and only three candidates' names were registered.

2017 election
2017 Moray Council election

2015 by-election

2014 by-election

2012 election
2012 Moray Council election

2007 election
2007 Moray Council election

References

Wards of Moray
Buckie